Erich Kühnhackl (born 17 October 1950) is a German former professional ice hockey player, born and raised in Czechoslovakia. He is one of the all-time greats of German ice hockey and was named Germany's ice hockey player of the 20th century in 2000. Kühnhackl is a member of the IIHF Hall of Fame as well as of the German ice hockey Hall of Fame and Germany's Sport Hall of Fame.

Career 
He won four German Championships and a bronze medal at the 1976 Winter Olympics in Innsbruck and is widely regarded as the best German hockey player ever and was inducted into the International Ice Hockey Federation Hall of Fame in 1997. Kühnhackl was also named the German ice hockey player of the Century in 2000. His nickname "Kleiderschrank auf Kufen" (wardrobe on skates) refers to his mighty appearance. In Finland he is known as Iso-Eerikki (Big Eric) for the same reason.

After his playing career Kühnhackl worked as coach of EV Landshut, German National Team, EC Bad Nauheim, Erding Jets, Polar Bears Regensburg and the Straubing Tigers. He served as sport director for the Frankfurt Lions of the Deutsche Eishockey Liga from June 2009 to June 2010 and was vice president of the Deutscher Eishockey-Bund, the German ice hockey federation, between 2010 and 2014.

Achievements
 won German Championships: 1970 with EV Landshut, 1977 and 1979 with Kölner Haie, 1983 with EV Landshut
 German Player of the Year (1978, 1980, 1983)
 211 international games played (131 G) including 3 Olympic Games and 10 World Championships
 won a bronze medal at the 1976 Winter Olympics in Innsbruck and was afterwards presented with the Silbernes Lorbeerblatt
 first German Top Scorer at the World Championships 1978 (15 points)
 774 German league games (724 G, 707 A, 1431 PTS, 1110 PIM)
 All-Star Team of the German Bundesliga 1976/77, 1977/78, 1978/79, 1979/80, 1981/82, 1982/83 and 1983/84
 Gustav-Jaenecke Cup (Best Scorer) 1973/74, 1976/77, 1977/78, 1978/79, 1979/80, 1982/83 and 1983/84
 Fritz-Poitsch-Trophy (Best Goalscorer) 1973/74 and 1979/80
 Xaver-Unsinn-Trophy (Most Assists) 1973/74, 1977/78, 1982/83 and 1983/84
 German ice hockey player of the Century 2000

Personal info 
He and his parents, who were of German descent, emigrated from Czechoslovakia after the Soviet occupation in 1968.

In 2010, his son Tom was drafted in the 4th round of the NHL Entry Draft by the Pittsburgh Penguins.

Career statistics

Regular season and playoffs

International

References

External links
 Erich Kühnhackl's Career Stats
 IIHF Hockey Hall of Fame bio
 
 
 
 

1950 births
People from Sokolov District
EHC Olten players
EV Landshut players
German ice hockey centres
Ice hockey players at the 1972 Winter Olympics
Ice hockey players at the 1976 Winter Olympics
Ice hockey players at the 1984 Winter Olympics
IIHF Hall of Fame inductees
Kölner Haie players
Living people
Olympic bronze medalists for West Germany
Olympic ice hockey players of West Germany
Olympic medalists in ice hockey
Medalists at the 1976 Winter Olympics
Czechoslovak emigrants to West Germany
West German ice hockey centres